Ricky Rydell Dillard (born February 25, 1965) is an American gospel musician. He started his music career, in 1987, as a Chicago house musician. His first Christian music album was Promise, by Muscle Shoals Records. His next album, A Holy Ghost Take-Over, was released in 1993 by Malaco Records. The subsequent album, Hallelujah, was released by them in 1995. Crystal Spring Records released, 1996's Work It Out, 2000's No Limit, and Unplugged in 2004. With EMI Gospel, he released, 7th Episode, that came out in 2007. He released, Keep Living, with Light Records in 2011. His next release, Amazing, came out in 2014 with Entertainment One Music.

All of his Christian albums charted on the Billboard Gospel Albums chart. His No Limit album charted on the Christian Albums chart, and the album Unplugged charted on the Independent Albums chart along with the releases Keep Living, and Amazing that also charted on The Billboard 200. He was nominated at the Grammy Awards twice, the first time in the Best Contemporary R&B Gospel Album category at the 34th Annual Grammy Awards for Promise, and the second time would come at the 57th Annual Grammy Awards in the category Best Gospel Album for Amazing.

Early life
Dillard was born on February 25, 1965, in Chicago Heights, Illinois, as Ricky Rydell Dillard. His mother and grandmother imparted to him a love of gospel music, and he was raised in the church singing in the choir at the age of five years, and eventually got the opportunity to direct the youth choir at St. Bethel Baptist Church. In 1981, he formed the first gospel choir at Bloom High School. Around that time, while working as a front desk clerk and later as a file clerk, he performed in a professional Backup band called Love, Salvation & Devotion (LSD) on the weekends. In 1984, he joined the late Milton Brunson's Thompson Community Singers. Also in 1984, he graduated from Bloom Township High School in Chicago Heights, Illinois.

Music career
Dillard started his recording career in 1987 in Chicago house music, to which he was introduced by the "Godfather of House", DJ Frankie Knuckles, a few years ago. In this genre, he collaborated with notable record producers such as Farley "Jackmaster" Funk on It's You (D.J. International Records, 1987) and As Always (Trax Records, 1988). He also worked with deep house pioneer Larry Heard, who was the main producer of Dillard's first album, Let The Music Use You, which was released on Jack Trax in 1989.

With his gospel choir Ricky Dillard's New Generation Chorale, founded in 1988, Dillard released his first gospel album, Promise, on November 28, 1990, on Muscle Shoals Records. It charted on the Billboard Gospel Albums chart at No. 15, and was being nominated at the 34th Annual Grammy Awards in the Best Contemporary R&B Gospel Album category. His second album, A Holy Ghost Take-Over, was released by Malaco Records on May 20, 1993. It charted on the Gospel Albums chart at No. 3. The next album, Hallelujah with Malaco Records, released on May 2, 1995, and it charted at No. 10 on the Gospel Album chart. On October 15, 1996, he released Worked It Out with Crystal Springs Records, and again this would chart on the Top Gospel Albums at No. 8. His next album with them, No Limit, came out on July 18, 2000, and this charted on two Billboard chart the Gospel Albums at No. 10 and Christian Albums at No. 32. While his last release, Unplugged, on the label was released on March 16, 2004, which this charted on the Gospel Albums at No. 9, and this time around charted on the Independent Albums at No. 49. The next album, 7th Episode, came out on October 2, 2007 with EMI Gospel, and this charted at No. 7 on the Gospel Albums chart. Light Records released Keep Living on April 26, 2011, which this charted on the Gospel Albums at No. 3, Independent Albums at No. 9, and on The Billboard 200 at No. 58. He partnered with Entertainment One Music to release, Amazing, on June 10, 2014, and this album charted on The Billboard 200 at No. 28, No. 5 on the Independent Albums, while placing at the top of the Gospel Albums chart. On August 13, 2019, he signed a record deal with Motown Gospel. As an agreement, Dr. Dillard and his choir, New G, did their 11th live recording. On September 28, 2019, he recorded his 11th album, Choirmaster. Choirmaster was released on May 1, 2020. Choirmaster was nominated for two awards at the 63rd Annual Grammy Awards. Dillard also won Traditional Choir of The Year at the 36th Annual Stellar Awards. On July 9, 2021, Dillard recorded his second album with Motown Gospel, 13th of all albums, and 12th gospel album. On September 9, Dillard released his first single from the upcoming album titled "All of My Help". The song played at the top of every hour on all iHeartRadio gospel stations. On September 17, Dillard released the single on all music streaming platforms. A second single was released, entitled "Behold Christ the Lord", on October 29, 2021 on every music streaming platform. Since then he has released three more singles, "Breakthrough", "He Won't Fail" and "Making Room" on December 2, December 9, and January 6, respectively. On January 21, 2022, Dillard released his album, "Breakthrough: The Exodus". He later appeared on The Kelly Clarkson Show singing "All of My Help" on February 22.

Success
Since his first gospel album Promise in 1991, all of his albums charted on the Billboard Gospel Albums chart. His No Limit album charted on the Christian Albums chart, and the album Unplugged charted on the Independent Albums chart along with the releases Keep Living, and Amazing that also charted on The Billboard 200.

Ricky Dillard was nominated at the Grammy Awards twice, the first time in the Best Contemporary R&B Gospel Album category at the 34th Annual Grammy Awards in 1992 for Promise, and the second time at the 57th Annual Grammy Awards in 2015 in the category Best Gospel Album for Amazing.

Also in 2015, he was nominated at the 30th Stellar Awards in the following categories: Artist of the Year, Song of the Year, Male Vocalist of the Year, CD of the Year, Choir of the Year, Producer of the Year, Traditional Male Vocalist of the Year, Traditional CD of the Year, and Traditional Choir of the Year. In 2021, at the 36th Annual Stellar Awards, Dr. Dillard earned Traditional Choir of the Year the day before his 12th live recording. In 2022, he received the James Cleveland Lifetime Achievement Award, Choir of the Year, Traditional Choir of the Year,  and Traditional Male Vocalist of the Year at the 37th Annual Stellar Awards.

Discography

References

External links
 Discography of Ricky Dillard on Discogs
 Artist profile on New Release Today
 Article on Ricky Dillard & New G Cross (2007) by Tony Cummings on Cross Rhythms

1965 births
Living people
African-American songwriters
African-American Christians
Musicians from Chicago
Songwriters from Illinois
MNRK Music Group artists
21st-century African-American people
20th-century African-American people